"Too Many Lovers" is a song written by Sam Hogin, Ted Lindsay and Mark True, and recorded by American country music artist Crystal Gayle.  It was released in May 1981 as the third single from the album These Days.  The song was Gayle's ninth number one on the country chart.  The single went to number one for one week and spent eleven weeks on the country chart.

Charts

References
 

1981 singles
1980 songs
Crystal Gayle songs
Song recordings produced by Allen Reynolds
Columbia Records singles
Songs written by Sam Hogin